Junaid Sait (born 24 May 1993) is a South African footballer who plays for Moroka Swallows as a defender.

References

External links
 
 

1993 births
Living people
South African soccer players
South African expatriate soccer players
Association football defenders
Milano United F.C. players
Falkenbergs FF players
Stellenbosch F.C. players
Cape Town Spurs F.C. players
Richards Bay F.C. players
Cape Umoya United F.C. players
National First Division players
South African Premier Division players
South African expatriate sportspeople in Sweden
Expatriate footballers in Sweden